Hatun Qurini (Quechua hatun big, Aymara chuqi, quri (<Quechua) gold, -ni a suffix to indicate ownership, "the big one with gold", Hispanicized spelling Jatún  Corini) is a mountain in the Peruvian Andes, about  high. It is situated in the Puno Region, Azángaro Province, San José District. Hatun Qurini lies northwest of the mountain Surupana.

References

Mountains of Puno Region
Mountains of Peru